Pingxi Historical Trail is a trail in Shuangxi District, New Taipei, Taiwan.

History
Originally, the trail used to be the path for timber transportation. It was widen for logging trucks to passed through.

Geology
The trail follows the paths along Pingxi River for a distance of 1.8 km. It is mostly flat.

Transportation
The trail is accessible by bus from Shuangxi Station of Taiwan Railways.

See also
Beishi River Historical Trail
Manyueyuan National Forest Recreation Area

References

Hiking trails in Taiwan
Tourist attractions in New Taipei